Red Deer—Mountain View is a federal electoral district in Alberta, Canada, that has been represented in the House of Commons of Canada since 2015.

Red Deer—Mountain View was created by the 2012 federal electoral boundaries redistribution and was legally defined in the 2013 representation order. It came into effect upon the call of the 42nd Canadian federal election, scheduled for October 2015. It was created mostly out of the southern half of Red Deer, including downtown, combined with small portions of Crowfoot and Wild Rose.

Members of Parliament

This riding has elected the following members of the House of Commons of Canada:

Election results

References

Alberta federal electoral districts
Politics of Red Deer, Alberta